"I Promise You (I.P.U.)" is a song by South Korean boy band Wanna One. The song serves as the pre-release single of their second extended play, 0+1=1 (I Promise You). The special theme track is dedicated to fans, marking the 333rd day since the group's first public appearance.

Charts

Weekly chart

Awards and nominations

Music program awards

References

External links 
 
 

Korean-language songs
2018 songs
Wanna One songs